Aveng (formerly Anglovaal Engineering) is an international infrastructure and resources company listed on the Johannesburg Stock Exchange. Its origins lie in modest construction projects, but Aveng now operates in steel, engineering, manufacturing, mining, concessions, public infrastructure and water treatment. Aveng currently operates in a diverse range of sectoral and geographic markets.

Aveng's primary geographic markets are southern Africa and Australia. It employs some 14,158 people and has an annual turnover in excess of R30 billion.

History

Strategic review (2017-2019) 
After Aveng reported large losses in September 2017, the company's CEO resigned. During the first half of FY2018, Aveng undertook a "robust strategic review" to fully evaluate their financial structure and operational performance to determine the key requirements for our medium- and long-term sustainability. Aveng announced in 2019 a strategic plan that they would dispose of businesses that did not support the group's long-term strategy. Aveng intended to dispose of the Grinaker-LTA and Trident Steel operating divisions first, followed by the individual manufacturing businesses. Aveng sold its rail business, Aveng Rail formerly known as Lennings Rail, in October 2018. Earlier, Aveng had announced it would also sell its Jet Park and Vanderbijlpark properties. Sean Flanagan was named CEO later in 2019, taking over from interim CEO Eric Diack, who returned to the role of chairperson. Aveng disposed of its Rand Roads business unit in July 2019. It told Reuters in 2019 it was selling non-core assets to focus on mining by 2020.

Divestitures (2020-2022) 
In relation to non-payment on a bridge project, Aveng lodged a claim against Eskom in April 2020. UBS Group AG became a 6.39% shareholder in Aveng in October 2021. In February 2022, while maintaining its placement on the JSE, Aveng narrowed its offshore listings to only bourses in Singapore and Australia. The company at the time described its two remaining core businesses as McConnell Dowell and Moolmans. It stated it still intended to sell Trident Steel. It completed that sale in October 2022. Aveng Trident Steel at the time supplied a wide range of products to the distribution, mining, construction and automotive industries from its steel processing service centers and warehouses, and its manufacturing and fabrication plants.

Aveng completed a debt restructure and rights issue in March 2021. In 2022, Sean Flanagan remained CEO of Aveng. In 2022, Aveng lost arbitration involving penalties for missing construction deadlines regarding The Leonardo building in South Africa, concerning a contract from 2015 to 2019.

Business and divisions

Core businesses 
Construction and Engineering
McConnell Dowell - a major engineering, construction and maintenance contractor, in the building, infrastructure and resources sectors in Australia, New Zealand and Pacific Islands, Southeast Asia and the Middle East.

Mining
Moolmans - a South African-based operator in open cut contract mining across Africa.

Major projects 
Gouda Wind Facility
The Leonardo
FNB Stadium

See also 
List of companies traded on the JSE
List of companies of South Africa
Economy of South Africa

References

External links 

Companies based in Johannesburg
Companies listed on the Johannesburg Stock Exchange
Steel companies of South Africa
Construction and civil engineering companies of South Africa
Mining companies of South Africa
1880 establishments in South Africa
Construction and civil engineering companies established in 1880